Andal Ampatuan is the name of:
Andal Ampatuan Sr. (1941–2015), Filipino politician, former governor of Maguindanao
Andal Ampatuan Jr., Filipino politician, former mayor of Datu Unsay, Maguindanao, and prime suspect in the Maguindanao massacre